The 1983 Monterrey Cup, also known as the Copa Monterrey, was a men's tennis tournament played on indoor carpet courts in Monterrey, Mexico. The event was part of the 1983 Volvo Grand Prix circuit. It was the fifth and last edition of the tournament and was held from February 28 through March 6, 1983. First-seeded Sammy Giammalva won the singles title.

Finals

Singles
 Sammy Giammalva defeated  Ben Testerman 6–4, 3–6, 6–3
 It was Giammalva's 1st singles title of the year and the 2nd of his career.

Doubles
 Nduka Odizor /  David Dowlen defeated  Andy Andrews /  John Sadri 3–6, 6–3, 6–4

References

External links
 ITF tournament edition details

Monterrey
1983 in Mexican tennis
Monterrey WCT